Bacolor is a crater in the Casius quadrangle of Mars, located at 33 North and 241.4 West.  in diameter, it is named after the municipality of Bacolor in Pampanga, Philippines.

The crater shows a double layer of ejecta. The inner layer came first. The impact's heat vaporized the ground and of course any ice where the meteorite struck. Shock waves spread outward from the impact point, smashing rocks and heaving the fragments skyward, along with steam and other hot gases. As the shock wave dug deeper, it excavated a bowl-shaped hole in the ground. A thick, probably hot, slurry of mud, water vapor, and rock fragments flew away from the growing cavity and fell to the ground, making the inner ejecta apron. The innermost portion of this layer covered the ground thickly and, near the crater rim, shows numerous signs of having flowed at least sluggishly.

Gallery

See also 
 Casius quadrangle
 Impact crater
 Impact event
 List of craters on Mars
 Ore resources on Mars
 Planetary nomenclature

References

Impact craters on Mars
Casius quadrangle